Isoamyl alcohol is a colorless liquid with the formula , specifically (H3C–)2CH–CH2–CH2–OH. It is one of several isomers of amyl alcohol (pentanol).  It is also known as isopentyl alcohol, isopentanol, or (in the IUPAC recommended nomenclature) 3-methyl-butan-1-ol. An obsolete name for it was isobutyl carbinol.

Isoamyl alcohol is an ingredient in the production of banana oil, an ester found in nature and also produced as a flavouring in industry. It is a common fusel alcohol, produced as a major by-product of ethanol fermentation.

Occurrence
Isoamyl alcohol is one of the components of the aroma of Tuber melanosporum, the black truffle.

The compound has also been identified as a chemical in the pheromone used by hornets to attract other members of the hive to attack.

Isoamyl acetate is a component of the natural aroma of bananas, especially the Gros Michel variety.

Extraction from fusel oil

Isoamyl alcohol can be separated from fusel oil by either of two methods: shaking with strong brine solution and separating the oily layer from the brine layer; distilling it and collecting the fraction that boils between 125 and 140 °C. Further purification is possible with this procedure: shaking the product with hot limewater, separating the oily layer, drying the product with calcium chloride, and distilling it, collecting  the fraction boiling between 128 and 132 °C.

Synthesis

Isoamyl alcohol can be synthesized by condensation of isobutene and formaldehyde which produces isoprenol and hydrogenation.  It is a colourless liquid of density 0.8247 g/cm3 (0 °C), boiling at 131.6 °C, slightly soluble in water, and easily dissolved in organic solvents. It has a characteristic strong smell and a sharp burning taste. On passing the vapour through a red-hot tube, it decomposes into acetylene, ethylene, propylene, and other compounds. It is oxidized by chromic acid to isovaleraldehyde, and it forms addition compounds crystals with calcium chloride and tin(IV) chloride.

Uses
Besides its use in the synthesis of banana oil, isoamyl alcohol is also an ingredient of Kovac's reagent, used for the bacterial diagnostic indole test.

It is also used as an antifoaming agent in the chloroform isoamyl alcohol reagent.

Isoamyl alcohol is used in a phenol–chloroform extraction mixed with the chloroform to further inhibit RNase activity and prevent solubility of RNAs with long tracts of poly-adenine.

References 

Primary alcohols
Alkanols